was formerly a rural district located in Gunma Prefecture, Japan. Parts of the citiesy of Takasaki, Maebashi, Shibukawa, the town of Yoshioka and the villages of Shintō and Takayama were formerly part of the district.

Nishigunma District was created on December 7, 1878, with the reorganization of Gunma Prefecture into districts. With the establishment of the municipalities system on April 1, 1889, the area was organized into six towns (Takasaki, Kuragano, Sōja, Kaneko, Shibukawa and Ikaho) and 32 villages.

On April 1, 1896, Takayama village was transferred to Azuma District and the remaining area of the district was merged with Kataoka District into Gunma District

Former districts of Gunma Prefecture